The Kota Belud District is an administrative district in the Malaysian state of Sabah, part of the West Coast Division which includes the districts of Kota Belud, Kota Kinabalu, Papar, Penampang, Putatan, Ranau and Tuaran. The capital of the district is in Kota Belud Town.

Etymology 
Kota Belud gained its name from the combination of two words in Bajau language. Kota means "fort" while Belud means a "hill" which consequently giving the meaning of "fort in a hill".

History 
In the past before the existence of a government body, there was often hostility between the races of different villages in the area. In order to defending themselves, they had to find a place to survive their opposition attacks. Hence, the Bajaus have chosen a hill as their fortress which subsequently known as "Kota Belud".

Demographics 

According to the last census in 2010, the population of Kota Belud district is estimated to be around 91,27, mainly Bajau, Illanun people and Dusun. As in other districts of Sabah, there are a significant number of illegal immigrants from the nearby southern Philippines, mainly from the Sulu Archipelago and Mindanao, many of whom are not included in the population statistics.

Mukim in Kota Belud District

1 	Mukim Ambong

2 	Mukim Bandar Kota Belud

3 	Mukim Dudar

4 	Mukim Kaguraan

5 	Mukim Kadaiman

6 	Mukim Kadamaian

7 	Mukim Kebayau

8 	Mukim Kedatuan

9 	Mukim Kelawat

10 	Mukim Kulambai

11 	Mukim Kinasaraban

12 	Mukim Lasau

13 	Mukim Mangkulat

14 	Mukim Pirasan
	
15 	Mukim Rampayan
16 	Mukim Rosok

17 	Mukim Sembirai

18 	Mukim Taginambur

19 	Mukim Taun Gusi

20 	Mukim Tempasuk

Notable Person

Politicians
Mohammad Said Keruak - The seventh Head of State of Sabah and the Fourth Chief Minister of Sabah
Salleh Said Keruak - The Ninth Chief Minister of Sabah, the former Speaker of the Sabah State Legislative Assembly, the former Senator and the Malaysian Minister of Communication and Multimedia.
Pandikar Amin Mulia - The Eight Speaker of the Dewan Rakyat, the lower house of Parliament of Malaysia
Abdul Rahman Dahlan - Malaysian Minister

Sportsman
Dass Gregory Kalopis - the former Malaysian Football Player 
Matlan Marjan - the former Malaysian Football Player
Zainizam Marjan - the former Malaysian Football Player

Singer
Gary Chaw -  Only Malaysian that have won 19th Golden Melody Awards 'Best Male Mandarin Singer', one of the most prestigious award in Chinese song industry

Gallery

See also 
 Districts of Malaysia

References

Further reading

External links 

  Kota Belud District Office